= Ältaren =

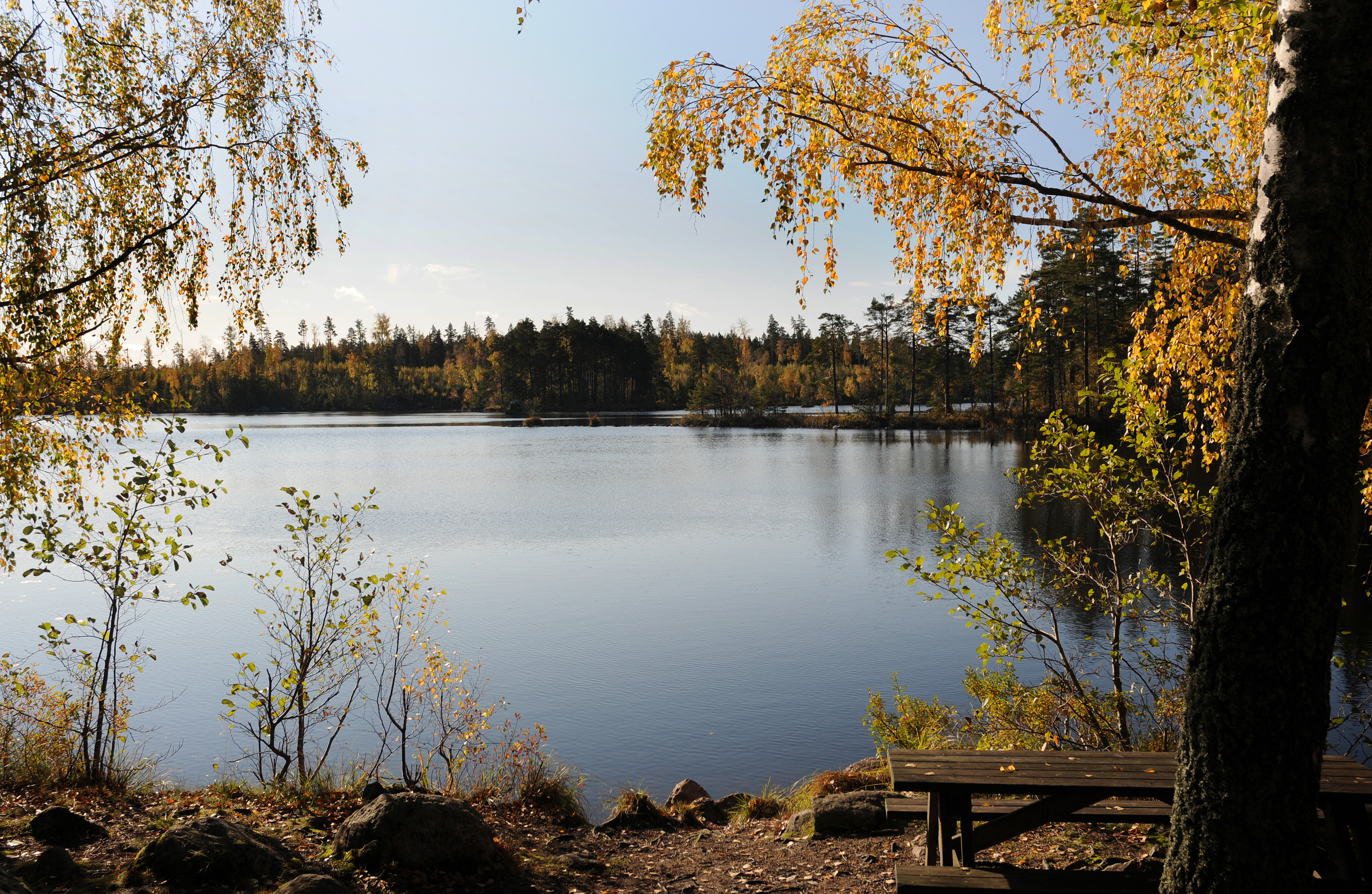
- lake Ältaren in Flen municipality, Södermanland, Sweden

- Location within Södermanland Location within Sweden
- Location: Södermanland, Sweden
- Coordinates: 59°12′N 16°50′E
- Type: lake
- Basin countries: Sweden

Ältaren is a lake in Södermanland, Sweden.
